USS Minnemac II (SP-202) was a United States Navy patrol vessel in commission from 1917 to 1919.

 Minnemac II was built as a civilian motorboat of the same name in 1914 by George Lawley and Sons at Neponset, Massachusetts. The U.S. Navy acquired her under a free lease from her owner, Arthur J. Eddy of Chicago, Illinois on 7 May 1917 for World War I service as a patrol vessel. She was enrolled in the Naval Defense Reserve Force on 3 July 1917 and commissioned as USS Minnemac II (SP-202) on 5 July 1917.

Assigned to the Great Lakes, Minnemac II patrolled the waters of Lake Michigan out of her assigned section patrol base.

Following the end of World War I, Minnemac II was returned to her owner on 13 January 1919.

References

Department of the Navy: Navy History and Heritage Command: Online Library of Selected Images: Civilian Ships: Minnemac II (Motor Boat, 1914). Served as USS Minnemac II (SP-202) in 1917-1919
NavSource Online: Section Patrol Craft Photo Archive: Minnemac II (SP 202)

Patrol vessels of the United States Navy
World War I patrol vessels of the United States
Ships built in Boston
1914 ships
Great Lakes ships